Professor Bean's Removal is a 1913 American short comedy film featuring Fatty Arbuckle.

Cast
 Roscoe 'Fatty' Arbuckle
 Charles Murray
 Mabel Normand
 Ford Sterling

See also
 List of American films of 1913
 Fatty Arbuckle filmography

External links

1913 films
1913 comedy films
American silent short films
American black-and-white films
Films directed by Henry Lehrman
1913 short films
Silent American comedy films
American comedy short films
1910s American films